Frank Charles Kniffin (April 26, 1894 – April 30, 1968) was an American lawyer and politician who served three terms as a U.S. Representative from Ohio from 1931 to 1939.

Early life and career 
Born on a farm near Stryker, Ohio, Kniffin attended the public schools and then studied law. He was admitted to the bar in 1919 and commenced practice in Napoleon, Ohio. 

He was an unsuccessful candidate for election in 1922 to the Sixty-eighth Congress, in 1924 to the Sixty-ninth Congress, in 1926 to the Seventieth Congress, and in 1928 to the Seventy-first Congress.

Congress 
Kniffin was elected as a Democrat to the Seventy-second and to the three succeeding Congresses (March 4, 1931–January 3, 1939). He was an unsuccessful candidate for reelection in 1938 to the Seventy-sixth Congress. As of 2020, he is the last Democrat to represent this district in Congress.

Later career and death 
Following the end of his term, he resumed the practice of law

He served as a referee in bankruptcy, northern district of Ohio, western division, from 1939 until his death in Napoleon, Ohio, April 30, 1968. He was interred in Wauseon Cemetery, Wauseon, Ohio.

References
 

1894 births
1968 deaths
People from Williams County, Ohio
People from Napoleon, Ohio
Ohio lawyers
20th-century American politicians
Burials in Ohio
20th-century American lawyers
Democratic Party members of the United States House of Representatives from Ohio